Hofkirchen is a German language place name, and may refer to:

Hofkirchen, Bavaria, Germany
in Austria:
Hofkirchen bei Hartberg, in Styria
Hofkirchen an der Trattnach, in Upper Austria
Hofkirchen im Mühlkreis, in Upper Austria
Hofkirchen im Traunkreis, in Upper Austria

See also 
 Hofkirche (disambiguation)